Infante was a title and rank given in the Iberian kingdoms during the Middle Ages, and still given today in Spain.

Infante can also refer to:
Alexis Infante (born 1961), Venezuelan baseball player (retired infielder)
Edward Anthony Infante (born 1940), former chief magistrate judge, United States District Court for the Northern District of California
José Miguel Infante (1778–1844), Chilean politician
Lindy Infante (1940–2015), American professional football coach
Lupita Infante, American singer-songwriter
Manuel Infante (1883–1958), Spanish composer
Omar Infante (born 1981), Venezuelan baseball player (current infielder)
Pedro Infante (1917–1957), Mexican singer and actor
Guillermo Cabrera Infante (1929–2005), Cuban writer

See also

Infant (disambiguation)
Infanta (disambiguation)